The Mariamo or Marri ammu are an indigenous Australian people of the Northern Territory.

Name
The ethnonym Mariamo/Marri Ammu signifies 'plains language'.

Language
Mariamo belongs to the Western branch of the Daly River language family.

Country
Their status as an in independent tribe has been maintained by both W. E. H. Stanner and Norman Tindale.

Notes

Citations

Sources

Aboriginal peoples of the Northern Territory